Khaled Habib El-Kebich (born January 24, 1970 in Tiaret, Algeria) is an Algerian film director, composer, singer-songwriter and an actor.

Early life
He composes and performs a genre of music which is both traditional and modern. He has developed a personal musical mix in which he blends different musical styles as well as music from all over the world and creates an exciting and unique musical style which is both innovative and captivating. His music could be described as having influences of funk, jazz, reggae, blues, soul, Latin rhythms as well as folk music from various corners of the world. The same applies to the mix of instruments with everything ranging from traditional drums to electronic sounds-capes.

Career
Khaled El Kebich artistic field extends into the domains of composing music for films and theatre plays, such as La Celestina set up at the Swedish Royal Dramatic Theater (Dramaten) under the direction of Robert Lepage (1998), and the film Nattbok by Carl Henrik Svenstedt, "Vingar av glas" and "Cappricciosa" directed by Reza Bagher,"Huvudrollen" by Leyla Assaf-Tangroth. Foursan Al Hoggar directed by Kamal Laham produced by Samira Hadjdjilani/EPTV Algerian Television and the feature film "El Hanachia" by Boualem Aissaoui produced by CADC (Centre Algerian du development du cinema).

From wild brash orchestral sounds to subliminal moody underscore and shimmering textures, Khaled El Kebich film-music and scoring is contemporary with emotional sounds-capes that enhance a film work whilst adhering to a consistent musical personality.

The fact that his style has its roots in Algerian music mixed with a variety of different musical directions partly because he has written and performed  with a number of bands of different ethnic background, such as Down By Law from Italy, New Phases from South Africa, Aquarius from France, Hada Raïna from Sweden, and others.

He has also participated at major European festivals such as: Falun Folkmusik Festival, Roskilde Festival, ArtGenda Festival, Stockholm Water Festival, Re:Orient Festival, Folk o Folk Festival, Verlden i Norden Festival, 550 Fatih Istanbul Festival and many others.

Discography 
 Slaves of Freedom, ( Hada Raina) 1998
 Celestina, 2000
 Khaled Habib Live, 2003
 The painted voice, Film-music 2004
 Nostalgia, 2004
 La Casbah De Brel ( Live) 2006
 Ultima Jam, 2007

Filmography 
 Knights of the Fantasia (2017)Documentary film
 The Rug (2018)Art-movie

External links
Khaled Habib on Reverb Nation
Khaled Habib 

1970 births
Living people
Algerian film score composers
Algerian artists
Algerian male television actors
Algerian record producers
Algerian film directors
21st-century Algerian male actors
Algerian contemporary artists
Male film score composers
20th-century Algerian  male singers
20th-century composers
21st-century Algerian  male singers
21st-century composers